Joan McEachern  (born April 12, 1963) is a Canadian soccer player who played as a midfielder for the Canada women's national soccer team. She was part of the team at the 1995 FIFA Women's World Cup.

In 1999, McEachern was inducted into the Canadian Soccer Hall of Fame.

References

External links
 
 / Canada Soccer Hall of Fame

1963 births
Living people
Canadian women's soccer players
Canada women's international soccer players
Place of birth missing (living people)
Soccer people from Saskatchewan
1995 FIFA Women's World Cup players
Women's association football midfielders